The 2008 L&H 500 was the ninth round of the 2008 V8 Supercar Championship Series. It was held on the weekend of the 12 to 14 September at Phillip Island Grand Prix Circuit in Victoria. It was the eighth Phillip Island 500 and the first to be staged since 1977. The L&H 500 saw the Phillip Island Grand Prix Circuit replace Sandown Raceway as the venue of the annual 500 kilometre two-driver V8 Supercar race. In an innovation for this round, two preliminary 14 lap races were held on Saturday with the two drivers of each car starting one race each. A single pitstop by each car in either race was mandated with the combined results of the two races determining the grid for the main 500 kilometre event.

After a late race error in Sunday's race from Jamie Whincup, Garth Tander swept by to take the win. Co-driver Mark Skaife became the first driver to win the 500 kilometre co-driver endurance race at three different venues, having previously won the 2000 Ozemail Queensland 500 and the Sandown 500 in 1989 and 2003.

Qualifying 
Qualifying was held on Saturday 13 September 2008.

Driver A Race 
The first race was held on Saturday 13 September 2008.

Driver B Race 
The first race was held on Saturday 13 September 2008.

500km Race
The 500 km race was held on Sunday 14 September 2008.

Results

Driver A Qualifying

Driver B Qualifying

Driver A Race results

Driver B Race results

500km race results

Round points
Each driver of each car was awarded championship points equal to the total points scored by that car over the three races. However, as with the 2008 Clipsal 500, overall round position was determined by position in the final race of the weekend rather than by total points scored in the round.

Standings
After round 9 of 14.

Support categories
The Phillip Island round of the 2008 V8 Supercar Championship Series had four support categories.

References

External links
Official timing and results
2008 L&H 500 images, www.motorsport.com

LandH 500
Motorsport at Phillip Island
Phillip Island 500
Pre-Bathurst 500